The Admiralty Powers, &c. Act (28 & 29 Vict. c. 124.) was an Act of the Parliament of the United Kingdom passed in 1865. It gained royal assent on 6 July 1865.

The Act 
It made the admiral-superintendent of every dockyard a justice of the peace regardless of location with respect to specific offences, and of all matters relating to Her Majesty's Naval Service and her supply. 

This gave them the authority to hear cases brought before him by the dockyard police (which were then the dockyard divisions of the Metropolitan Police). The rest of the Act dealt with punishments for forgery and impersonation of naval seamen (Sections 6 to 9) and clarified issues over the Board of Admiralty's involvement in legal actions (Sections 1–4). The final sections set up a reporting system for Orders in Council relating to the Act (Section 11), set 1 January 1866 as the latest date for the Act to come into effect (Section 10) and specified the Act's short title (Section 12).

Repeal 
Section 2 of the Act was repealed by the Crown Proceedings Act 1947 and the 1865 Act's Sections 6 to 9 (as well as the phrase "of all the offences specified in this Act, and" in its Section 5) were repealed by the Theft Act 1968 The rest of the Act has also been repealed.

References

Citations

Notes

Bibliography 

 

Police legislation in the United Kingdom
Ministry of Defence Police
United Kingdom Acts of Parliament 1865
1865 in British law

19th-century history of the Royal Navy
20th-century history of the Royal Navy
English criminal law
Forgery

Repealed United Kingdom Acts of Parliament